Riseley may refer to:

People
Frank Riseley (1877–1959), British tennis player
Martin Riseley (born 1969), Canadian violinist and concertmaster

Places
Riseley, Bedfordshire, a village in Bedfordshire, England
Riseley, Berkshire, a village in Berkshire, England